The Japan men's national field hockey team represents Japan in men's international field hockey and is operated by the Japan Hockey Association. As of January 2019, they are ranked 18th in the world.

The team participated in the first World Cup in 1971, where they finished 9th. The team is coached by Dutchman Siegfried Aikman. At the 2018 Asian Games, they won their first international tournament by claiming the gold medal in the final against Malaysia.

Tournament history

Summer Olympics
 1932 – 
 1936 – 7th place
 1956 – Withdrew
 1960 – 14th place
 1964 – 7th place
 1968 – 13th place
 2020 – 11th place

World Cup
 1971 – 9th place
 1973 – 10th place
 2002 – 12th place
 2006 – 9th place
 2023 – 15th place

Asian Games
 1958 – 5th place
 1962 – 4th place
 1966 – 
 1970 – 
 1974 – 4th place
 1978 – 4th place
 1982 – 4th place
 1986 – 5th place
 1990 – 6th place
 1994 – 4th place
 1998 – 4th place
 2002 – 6th place
 2006 – 4th place
 2010 – 6th place
 2014 – 6th place
 2018 – 
 2022 – Qualified

Asia Cup
 1985 – 4th place
 1989 – 4th place
 1994 – 9th place
 1999 – 5th place
 2003 – 4th place
 2007 – 4th place
 2009 – 6th place
 2013 – 5th place
 2017 – 5th place
 2022 – 4th place

Asian Champions Trophy
 2011 – 4th place
 2012 – 6th place
 2013 – 
 2016 – 6th place
 2018 – 4th place
 2021 –

Sultan Azlan Shah Cup
 1987 – 6th place
 2016 – 7th place
 2017 – 6th place
 2019 – 5th place
 2020 – Cancelled
 2022 – 4th place

Hockey World League
 2012–13 – 12th place
 2014–15 – 16th place
 2016–17 – 20th place

FIH Hockey Nations Cup
 2022 – 6th place

Champions Challenge
 2001 – 5th place
 2007 – 5th place
 2011 – 7th place
 2012 – 5th place
 2014 – 7th place

Players

Current squad
The following 18 players were named on 19 December 2022 for the 2023 World Cup in Bhubaneswar and Rourkela, India from 13 to 29 January 2023.

Head coach: Akira Takahashi

Recent call-ups
The following players have also been called up for the national team in the last 12 months.

See also
Japan women's national field hockey team

References

External links

FIH profile

Field Hockey
Asian men's national field hockey teams
National team
Men's sport in Japan